Preem is a Swedish petroleum and bio-fuel company (even referred to as a petroleum corporation) with approximately 570 petrol stations and two oil refineries in Sweden, Preemraff Göteborg in Gothenburg and Preemraff Lysekil outside of Lysekil. Preem refines a total of just over 18 million tonnes of crude oil per year. The business cover a large part of the value chain - from the processing of raw materials to sales. Preem purchase crude oil and renewable raw materials from around the world.

The raw materials are processed and sold as fuels, heating oil, lubricating oils and other products to both companies and individuals in Sweden and Norway The majority of our production, approximately 80%, is exported to the international market, mainly in north-west Europe, which means that Preem is among the largest Swedish exporters. approximately half of all petroleum products consumed in Sweden come from Preem's refineries. Sales on the Swedish market are carried out through Preem's station network in Sweden for private and professional traffic as well as through certified dealers. In Norway, the products are mainly sold through retailers and in bulk via direct sales.

Preem worked until 1996 under the name OK Petroleum. Until 1994, OKP was owned by the Swedish government, Neste OY and KF. Since 1994, Preem has been owned by the Ethiopian-Saudi business man Mohammed al-Amoudi through his British-Swedish holding company Corral Petroleum Holdings AB.

In 2019, the turnover was SEK 95,758 million and the operating result was SEK 1,785 million. The number of employees was just over 1.500. Including partners, retailers and dealers, more than 3,000 people work under the Preem brand.

Preem sells fuel via manned stations with service shops, automatic stations and filling stations intended for heavy commercial traffic.

In 2017, the company released 2.1 million tonnes of carbon dioxide (of which about two-thirds at the Lysekil refinery). In 2019, the corresponding figure was 1.7 million tonnes To reduce carbon dioxide emissions, in the spring of 2020, Preem has started a CCS technology test facility, capturing and storing carbon dioxide.

Preem is planning for an expansion at the Lysekil refinery, which is an ongoing process.

Owner structure
The Group's owner structure has 4 levels:

Mohammed H. Al Amoudi → Moroncha Holdings Co. Ltd → Corral Petroleum Holdings AB → Preem AB

Services
Preem has three types of petrol stations:
 Manned petrol stations.
 Unmanned stations where the price is slightly lower but which also does not offer services like water or air.
 Petrol stations for heavy professional traffic. 
Preem also has several international partnerships for professional traffic through various card alliances and collaborations

History
Corral Petroleum, a MIDROC company registered in Sweden, acquired OK Petroleum in 1994. In May 1996, OK Petroleum changed name to Preem, a version of “pre-eminent”.

References

External links
Preem
Preem Annual Report 2019
Preem Sustainability Report 2019

Oil companies of Sweden
Companies based in Stockholm